The 1924 National Amateur Cup was the USFA's annual cup-tie competition exclusively for amateur soccer teams. It was the second attempt but the first to be completed successfully. There were 81 entries of which Fleisher Yarn emerged as victors. The incentive in the tournament was that the winners would get to represent the U.S. at the Paris Olympics and each game was designated as an official "Olympic Tryout". It was believed that sending the champion amateur team would provide a squad with better chemistry than that of an all-star selection and require considerably less time to gel as a unit. However, as the tournament neared its final stages it became apparent that this idea might have to be reconsidered since the majority of the players on the remaining teams were foreign born and would not be eligible for the U.S. team. The only team with all American born players was the Union Electrics of St. Louis who had withdrawn at the quarterfinal stage. At the conclusion of the final game the eligible players on both the Fleisher Yarn and Swedish American teams were chosen while the remainder of the Olympic squad had to be selected from other amateur teams.

Bracket
{{Round16

|February 17 - Cleveland|Magyar American|4|Sons of St.George|1
|February 10, 16|Heidelberg|3-4|Jeannette|3-2
|March 16 - Detroit|Scarlet Runners|2|Swedish American|4
|January 20 - St. Louis|Union Electric|7|Memphis K of C|0
|February 2 - Roslindale, MA|Boston Blues|0|Clan Robertson|4
|February 2 - Roxbury, MA|Roxbury|0|Worcester Rangers|2
|February 9 - Philadelphia|Fleisher Yarn|3|American A.A.|1|January 27 - Queens, NY|Steinway FC|6|Calpe American|

|March 9 - Cleveland|Magyar American|3|Heidelberg|2
||Swedish American|w/o|Union Electric|
|March 7 - Worcester, MA, March 22  - Boston|Clan Robertson|2-1|Worcester Rangers|2-2
|March 1 - Philadelphia|Fleisher Yarn|W|Steinway FC|

|March 30 - Cleveland|Magyar American|1|Swedish American|2
|April 5 - Shawsheen Village|Worcester Rangers|0|Fleisher Yarn|8

|April 20 - Chicago|Swedish American|0|Fleisher Yarn|3|RD1=Round of 16
|RD2=Quarterfinals
|3rdplace=no}}Eastern QuarterfinalsWestern QuarterfinalsEastern SemifinalsWestern SemifinalsUnion Electric withdrawalThe original plan was for the 1924 Amateur Cup champion to serve as the United States team in the 1924 Olympic soccer tournament. As the tournament reached the Quarterfinals, it was realized many of the teams had foreign born players who would be ineligible for the Olympic team. The U.S.F.A. decided instead to fill out the roster with players from different teams across the country along with players from the two teams in the final.

Union Electric management felt that since their team was the only one with a 100% Olympic eligible roster, all other teams remaining should be disqualified and the championship should be awarded to Union. Union also claimed there was no plan to reimburse their travel expense to Chicago to play Swedish American FC. When the U.S.F.A. declined Union’s request to disqualify everyone else, they withdrew from the tournament.Eastern FinalWestern FinalFinal'''

See also
1923-24 National Challenge Cup
1924 American Cup

References

Ama
National Amateur Cup